Caroline Anne Hare (born 7 June 1964) is a former New Zealand representative runner from Wellington. She currently holds the New Zealand women's record for the 2000 m.

Hare competed at the 1996 Summer Olympics, where she placed 13th in the women's 5000 m final. She was a participant at three Commonwealth Games, in 1986, 1990 and 1994.

Hare is currently a board member on the New Zealand Olympic Committee.

In 1990, Hare was awarded the New Zealand 1990 Commemoration Medal.

Personal bests

References

Living people
1964 births
Athletes from Wellington City
New Zealand female middle-distance runners
New Zealand female long-distance runners
Athletes (track and field) at the 1996 Summer Olympics
Athletes (track and field) at the 1986 Commonwealth Games
Athletes (track and field) at the 1990 Commonwealth Games
Athletes (track and field) at the 1994 Commonwealth Games
Olympic athletes of New Zealand
Commonwealth Games competitors for New Zealand